Ducati is a group of companies, best known for manufacturing motorcycles and headquartered in Borgo Panigale, Bologna, Italy. The group is owned by German automotive manufacturer Audi through its Italian subsidiary Lamborghini, which is in turn owned by the Volkswagen Group.

The group currently comprises four companies:
 Ducati Motor Holding S.p.A., a motorcycle-manufacturing division previously known as Ducati Meccanica
 Ducati Corse, which runs the Ducati motorcycle racing program and is wholly owned by Ducati Motor Holding
 Ducati Energia, formerly known as Ducati Elettronica, a designer and manufacturer of electrical and electronic components and systems
 Ducati Sistemi, a subsidiary of Ducati Energia, which provides electronic and information-technology products for road transport, railway transport, and transport automation applications

In the 1930s and 1940s, Ducati manufactured radios, cameras, and electrical products such as razors. Ducati also made a marine binocular called the BIMAR for the Kriegsmarine during World War II, some of which were sold on the civilian market after the war. The Ducati Sogno was a half-frame Leica-like camera which is now a collector's item. Ducati and Bianchi have developed and launched a new line of racing bicycles.

Ducati Motor Holding often uses electrical components and subsystems from Ducati Energia.

History 
In 1926 Antonio Cavalieri Ducati and his three sons, Adriano, Marcello, and Bruno Cavalieri Ducati, founded Società Scientifica Radiobrevetti Ducati (SSR Ducati) in Bologna to produce vacuum tubes, condensers and other radio components. In 1935 they had become successful enough to enable construction of a new factory in the Borgo Panigale area of the city.  Production was maintained during World War II, despite the Ducati factory being a repeated target of Allied bombing.

The company started manufacturing motorcycle-related items when in 1950, manufacturing the "Cucciolo", an engine for mounting on bicycles, for a small Turinese firm, SIATA (Societa Italiana per Applicazioni Tecniche Auto-Aviatorie), later selling a product of their own based on the Cucciolo. In the following years, the company expanded their offer when the market moved on to larger motorcycles.

In 1953, management split the company into two separate entities, Ducati Meccanica SpA and Ducati Elettronica, in acknowledgment of its diverging motorcycle and electronics product lines. Ducati Elettronica became Ducati Energia SpA in the eighties. Dr. Giuseppe Montano took over as head of Ducati Meccanica SpA and the Borgo Panigale factory was modernized with government assistance. By 1954, Ducati Meccanica SpA had increased production to 120 bikes a day.

In the 1960s, Ducati earned its place in motorcycling history by producing the fastest 250cc road bike then available, the Mach 1. In 1985, Cagiva bought Ducati and planned to rebadge Ducati motorcycles with the "Cagiva" name. By the time the purchase was completed, Cagiva kept the "Ducati" name on its motorcycles. Eleven years later, in 1996, Cagiva accepted the offer from Texas Pacific Group and sold a 51% stake in the company for US$325 million; then, in 1998, Texas Pacific Group bought most of the remaining 49% to become the sole owner of Ducati. In 1999, TPG issued an initial public offering of Ducati stock and renamed the company "Ducati Motor Holding SpA". TPG sold over 65% of its shares in Ducati, leaving TPG the majority shareholder. In December 2005, Ducati returned to Italian ownership with the sale of Texas Pacific's stake (minus one share) to Investindustrial Holdings, the investment fund of Carlo and Andrea Bonomi.

In April 2012, Volkswagen Group's Audi subsidiary announced its intention to buy Ducati for € (US$). Volkswagen chairman Ferdinand Piëch, a motorcycle enthusiast, had long coveted Ducati, and had regretted that he passed up an opportunity to buy the company from the Italian government in 1984. Analysts doubted a tiny motorcycle maker would have a meaningful effect on a company the size of Volkswagen, commenting that the acquisition has "a trophy feel to it," and, "is driven by VW's passion for nameplates rather than industrial or financial logic". Italian luxury car brand Lamborghini was strengthened under VW ownership. AUDI AG's Automobili Lamborghini S.p.A. subsidiary acquired 100 percent of the shares of Ducati Motor Holding S.p.A. on 19 July 2012 for € (US$).

Ownership 
Since 1926, Ducati has been owned by a number of groups and companies.
 1926–1950 – Ducati family
 1950–1967 – Government Istituto per la Ricostruzione Industriale (IRI) management
 1967–1978 – Government EFIM management (control over day-to-day factory operations)
 1967–1973 – Headed By Giuseppe Montano
 1973–1978 – Headed by Cristiano de Eccher
 1978–1985 – VM Group
 1985–1996 – Cagiva Group
 1996–2005 – Texas-Pacific Group (US-based) ownership and going public
 Headed by CEO Federico Minoli, 1996–2001; returning for 2003–2007
 2005–2008 – Investindustrial Holdings S.p.A.
 2008–2012 – Performance Motorcycles S.p.A.
An investment vehicle formed by Investindustrial Holdings, BS Investimenti and Hospitals of Ontario Pension Plan
 19 July 2012 – present – Automobili Lamborghini S.p.A.
AUDI AG acquired 100% of the voting rights of Ducati Motor Holding S.p.A. via Audi's Automobili Lamborghini S.p.A. subsidiary

 From the 1960s to the 1990s, the Spanish company MotoTrans licensed Ducati engines and produced motorcycles that, although they incorporated subtle differences, were clearly Ducati-derived. MotoTrans's most notable machine was the 250 cc 24 Horas (Spanish for "24 hours").

References

 
Italian brands
Vehicle manufacturing companies established in 1926
Italian companies established in 1926
Audi
Volkswagen Group